Montrose Mausoleum is located in the Scottish village of Aberuthven, Perth and Kinross. Dating to 1736, it is a Category A listed building. It stands in the kirkyard of St Kattan's Church.

It is believed architect William Adam allowed his 15-year-old son, John, to do some work on the structure, for his name is in an inscription in its northern wall.

Several Dukes of Montrose are interred in the structure, including James Graham (1682–1742), the last being in 1836.

Gallery

See also
List of Category A listed buildings in Perth and Kinross

References 

Category A listed buildings in Perth and Kinross
Listed monuments and memorials in Scotland
Mausoleums in Scotland